David Chiang Tai-wai (born Chiang Wei-nien; 29 June 1947) is a Hong Kong actor, director and producer. A well-known martial arts actor formerly from Shaw Brothers Studio in the 1970s, he has appeared in over 130 films and 30 television series.

Early life 
Chiang was born in Shanghai, China on 29 June 1947. Chiang's mother Hung Wei (紅薇) (real name: Lo Chen 羅珍), and father Yan Fa (嚴化) (real name: Chiang Ko-chi) were popular Chinese movie stars who later arrived in Hong Kong in the late 1940s while he was still young during the Chinese Civil War. Chiang has an older brother Paul Chun and a half-brother Derek Yee.

Career 
Chiang began his acting career at a very young age, appearing in black and white films when he was only four years old.
In 1966, while working as a stuntman and fight instructor for the Shaw Brothers Studio, Chiang was spotted by director Chang Cheh, who immediately saw his potential and screen presence, and became his mentor. Chang gave him the stage name David Chiang, even though his real English name was John.

With Wang Yu's sudden departure in 1969, Run Run Shaw and his senior executives were looking for a new leading man and made Chiang an offer. In 1970, under Chang Cheh's guidance, Chiang won the Best Actor award at the 16th Asian Film Festival for his role in Vengeance. In 1972, at the 18th Asian Film Festival, he won the Best Actor Golden Horse Award for his role in Blood Brothers. In 1973, at the 19th Asian Film Festival, he won the Most Contemporary award for his role in The Generation Gap.

In 1973 Chiang left Hong Kong with his mentor Chang Cheh and set up an independent production company called Chang's Scope Company. With the help and encouragement of Run Run Shaw, their films continued to be distributed through Shaw's channels. At Chang's Scope Company, Chiang was able to try his hand at directing, producing and script writing. As the 1970s came to an end and the 1980s approached, Chiang continued acting, working with directors Lee Han Chiang, Hsueh Li Pao, Ho Meng-hua and Chia-Liang Liu. In 1980 he debuted in his first television series, The Green Dragon Conspiracy, followed by Princess Chang Ping and Dynasty. In the mid-1980s, Chiang got the opportunity to work with his brothers, Paul Chun and Derek Yee, directing, producing and acting in the comedy Legend of the Owl. Chiang also acted in several other comedy movies The Challenger and The Loot, directed by Eric Tseng. In late 1980s into early 1990s Chiang directed the movies Heaven Can Help, Silent Love, The Wrong Couples, Mr. Handsome, Double Fattiness, My Dear Son, Will of Iron and Mother of a Different Kind. Since 2000 he has continued to work in movies and TV series, including Election, Daisy, Revolving Doors of Vengeance, Lethal Weapons of Love and Passion, Land of Wealth, The Family Link and the 2007 television series The Gem of Life. He was nominated for Best Supporting Actor in 2006 for his role in the TVB series Revolving Doors of Vengeance.

In 2004, Chiang was inducted into The Avenue of Stars, which honours celebrities of the Hong Kong film industry. It is located along the Victoria Harbour waterfront in Tsim Sha Tsui, Hong Kong and modeled on the Hollywood Walk of Fame.

Personal life
On 20 January 1974, Chiang married Maggie Lee Lam Lam (李琳琳), an actress. Chiang and his wife have three children, Elaine Chiang (b. 1974), who is married to actor Raymond Cho, Eve Chiang (b. 1983), and John Chiang, Jr. (b. 1995).

He currently lives in Vancouver, Canada with his family, but returns to Hong Kong to film movies and television dramas.

Filmography

Films

Film (as director)
The Drug Addict (1974) 	  	 
A Mad World of Fools (1974) 	  	 
The One-Armed Swordsmen (1976) 	  	 
The Condemned (1976) 	  	 
Whirlwind Kick (1977) 	  	 
The Legend of the Owl (1981) 	  	 
Heaven Can Help (1984) 	  	 
Silent Love (1986) 	  	 
Mr. Handsome (1987) 	  	 
The Wrong Couples (1987) 	  	 
Double Fattiness (1988) 	  	 
My Dear Son (1989) 	  	 
When East Meets West (1990) 	  	 
Will of Iron (1991) 	  	 
Mother of a Different Kind (1995)

Television dramas

Gallery

References

External links

David Chiang Fan Site - DCFS
John Chiang Vietnam Fan Club

1947 births
Living people
Hong Kong Taoists
Hong Kong male film actors
Hong Kong martial artists
Hong Kong people of Manchu descent
Hong Kong people of Mongolian descent
Male actors from Shanghai
Manchu male actors
Shaw Brothers Studio
Sportspeople from Shanghai
TVB actors
Film directors from Shanghai
Hong Kong male television actors
20th-century Hong Kong male actors
21st-century Hong Kong male actors